Le Quiou is a commune in the Côtes-d'Armor department of Brittany in northwestern France.

Geography

Climate
Le Quiou has a oceanic climate (Köppen climate classification Cfb).

Population

The inhabitants of Le Quiou are known in French as quiousiens.

See also
Communes of the Côtes-d'Armor department

References

External links

Communes of Côtes-d'Armor